Freeman McNeil (born April 22, 1959) is an American former professional football player who was a running back for the New York Jets of the National Football League (NFL). He played college football for the UCLA Bruins. He was selected by the Jets in the first round of the 1981 NFL Draft with the third overall pick.

Early life
McNeil was born in Jackson, Mississippi. His family later relocated to Los Angeles, California.

McNeil led Banning High School to the Los Angeles City football title. At ,  he attended the University of California, Los Angeles (UCLA) as a running back, where he was a two-time All-Pac-10 selection. In his final game, he caught a deflected pass from quarterback Jay Schroeder that was tipped by USC defensive back Jeff Fisher and went 57 yards for the winning touchdown with two minutes left in the Bruins' 20–17 win.

In four seasons at UCLA, McNeil rushed for 3,195 yards and 21 touchdowns, with an average of more than 5 yards per carry.

Professional career
McNeil played in 12 NFL seasons for the New York Jets from 1981 to 1992. During the mid to late 1980s he was a member of the Jets' "Two Headed Monster" backfield along with teammate Johnny Hector, a tandem that ranked among the league's elite.  When he retired he was the Jets all-time leading rusher with 8,074 yards; he was surpassed by Curtis Martin and currently ranks second in Jets team history. In 1982, McNeil led the NFL in rushing with 786 yards. He was the first Jet to the lead the league in rushing.  He is one of a few running backs in NFL history to average 4.0 yards per carry in every season he played.

From 1990 to 1992 McNeil was the lead plaintiff in a case won by jury verdict that struck down the NFL's Plan B free agency system, under which teams could protect 37 players. McNeil and the seven other plaintiffs were among the protected players listed by their teams. The system was deemed too restrictive and a violation of antitrust laws. However, Freeman was not one of the four plaintiffs awarded damages. The suit is considered a major step in the achievement of free agency rights by the NFL Players Association.

Honors and awards
In 2005, McNeil was inducted into the Nassau County Sports Hall of Fame.

References

1959 births
Living people
American football running backs
New York Jets players
UCLA Bruins football players
American Conference Pro Bowl players
Players of American football from Jackson, Mississippi
Players of American football from Los Angeles
African-American players of American football
21st-century African-American people
20th-century African-American sportspeople
Ed Block Courage Award recipients